The March 1956 demonstrations (also known as the 1956 Tbilisi riots or 9 March massacre) in the Georgian SSR were a series of protests against Nikita Khrushchev's de-Stalinization policy, which shocked Georgian supporters of Stalinist ideology. The center of the protests was the republic's capital, Tbilisi, where spontaneous rallies to mark the third anniversary of Stalin's death and to protest Khrushchev's denunciation of Stalin quickly evolved into an uncontrollable mass demonstration and rioting which paralyzed the city. Soon, political demands such as the change of the central government in Moscow and calls for the independence of Georgia from the Soviet Union appeared.

The local Georgian authorities, confused and demoralized, passed on the responsibility to the Soviet military. Later on 9 March the troops deployed in the city opened fire upon the students picketing the government buildings in what the official Soviet version held was "an act of self-defense". The agitated crowds continued resistance on 10 March but were eventually dispersed by tanks. Estimates of the number of casualties range from several dozens to several hundred.

In spite of prompt pacification, the 1956 events marked a turning point after which Georgian loyalty to the Soviet Union was gravely compromised and the nation's consolidation intensified. In the view of the historian Ronald Grigor Suny, "the swift and brutal response from the Soviet government illustrated starkly its inability to resolve the dilemma of how much of the Soviet system to change and how much of Stalin's authoritarianism to preserve. The government’s confusion in Tbilisi was a bloody sign that reform was to be limited by the party's determination to preserve its essential monopoly of power."

Background

Khrushchev's speech 

On 25 February 1956, at a closed session of the 20th Congress of the Communist Party of the Soviet Union, the Soviet leader Nikita Khrushchev delivered a "secret speech" in which he criticized actions taken by the Stalin regime, particularly the purges of the military and the upper Party echelons, and the development of Stalin's cult of personality, while maintaining support for other ideals of Communism by invoking Vladimir Lenin.

Rumors that "Vozhd" (the Leader) and "the Father of the Nations", who had been established as the principal symbol in early Soviet communism, had been denounced by his successor quickly spread throughout the Soviet Union. Although the details were unknown, it came as a real shock to the Soviet society.

Reaction in Georgia

In spite of the party's restriction of Georgian nationalism, Khrushchev's policy of de-Stalinization was, paradoxically, a blow to Georgian national pride. The younger generation of the Georgians, not fully acquainted with the darker side of Stalin's rule and bred on the panegyrics and permanent praise of the "genius" of Stalin, was proud to consider him being a Georgian that ruled over great Russia, and, as believed widely, dominated the world. Now, Stalin's denigration was seen as a symbol for the mistreatment of Georgian national consciousness at the hands of the Russian/Soviet rulers.

Patriotic sentiment mixed with political protest was further inflamed by the sarcastic and bitter manner in which Khrushchev ascribed all horrors of the era to the "genial" leader Stalin, whom, as he ironically put it, the Georgians so much enjoyed calling "the great son of the Georgian nation". Eduard Shevardnadze, then a Komsomol leader in Kutaisi and eventually to become President of post-Soviet Georgia, later recalled that Khrushchev's ironic remark on Georgians at the end of his speech was particularly hurtful to the pride of Georgian youth.

The painful reaction caused by de-Stalinization in Georgia has been variously interpreted. It has been seen by many as a revival of Stalinism and by others as the first open expression of Georgian nationalism since the abortive revolt in 1924.  of the Russian Academy of Sciences relates:

The events in Georgia passed largely unreported in the Soviet press and became a taboo theme for several decades to come. What happened can be reconstructed on the analysis of several, though frequently conflicting, contemporary reports, eyewitnesses' accounts and a few surviving secret Soviet documents.

Demonstrations 

According to the special report of Vladimir Janjgava, Georgian SSR Minister of Internal Affairs, the unrest began on 4 March 1956, when groups of students gathered to mark the third anniversary of Stalin's death at the Stalin monument at the Kura embankment in downtown Tbilisi. Indignant at Khrushchev's speech, they were aggressive towards the policemen who had thrown a cordon around the area. Georgian communist Parastishvili climbed the Stalin monument, drank some wine from a bottle, smashed the bottle and said: "Let Stalin's enemies die, like this bottle!".

The demonstration gradually grew large, attracting more and more people, who were bringing memorial wreaths to the Stalin monument. The confused local authorities did not actively oppose these activities. The demonstrations in the capital triggered similar protests in other parts of the republic such as Gori, Kutaisi, Rustavi, Sukhumi, and Batumi.

By 6 March the demonstrations in Tbilisi had become more organized and more numerous. That day a closed letter of the CPSU Central Committee, "On the Cult of Personality", a summary of the speech that the General Secretary read on the final day of the Party Congress held last February, was read loud at a special session attended by the Georgian ministers and the local media. News about the surprise session of the Georgian SSR's Ministers Council quickly spread throughout Tbilisi and the situation escalated.

Early on 7 March the students of Tbilisi State University went out onto the streets instead of attending classes, where they were joined by students from other institutes and schoolchildren. The demonstrators went down the main Tbilisi thoroughfare, Rustaveli Avenue, to Lenin Square, stopping at the House of Government and then at the City Hall, chanting the slogan "Long Live Great Stalin! Long Live the Party of Lenin and Stalin! Long Live Soviet Georgia!", accompanied by the cacophony of car sirens and horns. Having overcome the police resistance, the protesters gathered anew at the Stalin monument.

Protesters worked out their demands to authorities: an official holiday day on 18 December (Stalin's birthday), publishing of articles devoted to Stalin's life in all local newspapers, showing of films The Fall of Berlin and The Unforgettable Year 1919 by Mikheil Chiaureli (both films were typical cinematic pieces of Stalin's cult of personality) in cinemas and invitation of the Chinese marshal Zhu De, who was at that time visiting Georgia, to the meeting. By the end of day, the number of demonstrators reached 70,000. The central Soviet Ministry of Internal Affairs initially underestimated the scale of the protests, and the information based on the minister Janjghava reached the Central Committee later on 8 March.

By that time, the city had become paralyzed. The meetings were simultaneously held in several places, especially in Lenin Square and at the wreath-covered Stalin monument. The central streets were full of the demonstrators who loudly denounced Khrushchev, demanded that Stalin be rehabilitated and that his anniversary be allowed, and specifically asked Vyacheslav Molotov to defend Stalin's name. Barricades were raised, buses and cars overturned. The crowd directed traffic and in several cases even stopped it. Several clashes broke out with the drivers who resisted and with the police. When several activists were arrested, the demonstrations grew even more massive and the crowd became more aggressive. The Georgian first secretary, Vasil Mzhavanadze, addressed the protesters and the visiting Chinese marshal Zhu De greeted the crowd, but he refused to visit the Stalin monument and the demonstrations did not disperse.

As the demonstrations continued, the local government began to lose control over the situation. Paralyzed by the scale of the protests and the demonstrators' appeal to Georgian patriotism and manifested communist loyalties, the police reacted more and more sluggishly. Early on 9 March the authorities tried to defuse the tensions and allowed the celebration of the anniversary to be held. But the belated attempts at concession did not yield any result. Later that day, at the meeting near the Stalin monument, political demands were read aloud in the presence of several party officials.

According to the controversial testimony of Ruben Kipiani, later tried as an author of this petition, the demands were: first, return of the "closed letter" on Stalin to the CPSU Central Committee; second, removal of Anastas Mikoyan, Nikolai Bulganin, and Nikita Khrushchev from both party and government positions; third, creation of a new government; fourth, release of the Azerbaijan SSR first secretary Mir Jafar Baghirov from prison; fifth, promotion of the Soviet Georgian officials Akaki Mgeladze and Mzhavandze to the Central Committee Presidium; sixth, appointment of Stalin's son Vasily to the Central Committee; seven, institution of an amnesty. It was decided to send approximately ten persons to the nearby Communications Building in Rustaveli Avenue in order to send a telegram to Moscow.

A parallel rally at Kolmeurneobis Square grew increasingly anti-Soviet. People were singing the long-suppressed anthem "Dideba" and waving flags of pre-Soviet Georgia. When some persons in civilian dress interfered, fighting broke out. Leaflets appeared next. According to the eyewitness and Georgian-Jewish author Faina Baazova (daughter of David Baazov), the leaflets called for the secession of Georgia from the Soviet Union, a demand not heard previously.

The events that followed are less clear. Later that day, the decision to bring troops of the Transcaucasian Military District, then commanded by Col. Gen. Ivan Fedyuninsky, into the matter was made in Moscow. The predominantly Georgian units stationed in the area were not deployed because of suspected unreliability, however. The Soviet Interior Ministry officials reported that Tbilisi had gone out of control. They claimed that the demonstrators, many of whom were allegedly drunk and armed, were pillaging the city, contemplated the pogroms of ethnic Russians and Armenians, and planned to seize the government buildings.

The same evening, the authorities broadcast though radio an appeal calling the rallies to cease and announced that the commander of Tbilisi garrison, Major General Gladkov, was introducing a curfew beginning at midnight on 10 March. Many protesters sensed an approaching threat and began to leave the city center. Close to midnight, however, people learned that the delegation sent into the Communications Building had been detained, ostensibly for verification of identity. The crowd rushed to rescue the delegates and a clash with the soldiers guarding the building ensued. The troops started firing into the crowd to prevent the protesters from storming the building. Simultaneously, tanks moved to oust the demonstrators from Lenin Square and at the Stalin monument. The protesters tried to resume rallies on 10 March, but they were again dispersed by the troops. Several dozens, if not hundreds, died in this crackdown. As no official report exists, various estimates put the number of casualties from 106 to 800. Hundreds were wounded and injured. Over 200 were arrested in the ensuing reprisals and many were subsequently deported to labor camps in Siberia.

Consequences 
The March 1956 rallies widened rifts within the Georgian Communist Party, as several officials expressed solidarity with the people. In July 1956, the Central Committee in Moscow issued a resolution critical of the Georgian Communist leadership, and in August the second secretary in Tbilisi was replaced by a Russian. Yet, Mzhavanadze was successful in pacifying Georgians by minimizing the number of victims in his interviews and sponsoring a program of lectures to spread the party's new views. For his success, Mzhavanadze was raised to candidate membership in the Central Committee Presidium in June 1957.

Although no apparent attempts at defying the Soviet rule in Georgia were to be made until April 1978, the grudges against the central government in Moscow continued to be held. Many in Georgia held Khrushchev personally responsible for ordering the army to fire on the protesters. The Tbilisi events made Georgia's deviance from the rest of the Soviet Union, with the possible exception of the Baltics, apparent. The loyalty to the Union was compromised and an anti-Soviet sentiment became an essential feature of the reemerging Georgian nationalism. As Irakli Khvadagiani, affiliated with the SovLab research laboratory, has argued, the events contributed to self-victimization and nationalism.

It was in the immediate aftermath of the 1956 event that the first Georgian underground groups calling for an outright secession from the Soviet Union appeared. They were typically small and weak and the Soviet authorities were able to quickly neutralize them. However, they gave origin to a new generation of dissidents, such as Merab Kostava and Zviad Gamsakhurdia, both teenage participants of the March 1956 rally, who would lead Georgia into its struggle for independence in the 1980s.

In Georgia, groups such as SovLab lead commemoration ceremonies for the victims of Stalinism, also in an effort to address the legacy of pro-Stalin sentiment.

See also 
Cult of personality
De-Stalinization
1978 Tbilisi Demonstrations
9 April tragedy
Hungarian Revolution of 1956
Poznań 1956 protests
Prague Spring

References

Citations

Further reading

External links
 RusArchives.ru: 1956 photo of the Stalin monument (now removed) in Tbilisi.
Revolutionarydemocracy.org: Soviet journalist about the incidents in Georgia, March 1956.
Soviethistory.org: L. Piradov’s Criticism of Student Behavior, 1956.

1956 in Georgia (country)
1956
Georgian Soviet Socialist Republic
Political repression in Georgia (country)
Political repression in the Soviet Union
1956 in the Soviet Union
De-Stalinization
Anti-revisionism
Protests in the Soviet Union
Massacres in the Soviet Union
Rebellions in the Soviet Union
Riots and civil disorder in the Soviet Union
Demonstrations
Conflicts in 1956
March 1956 events in Europe
1956 riots
1956 protests
1950s in Tbilisi
1956 murders in the Soviet Union